Pahawh Hmong (RPA: Phaj hauj Hmoob ,; known also as Ntawv Pahawh, Ntawv Keeb, Ntawv Caub Fab, Ntawv Soob Lwj) is an indigenous semi-syllabic script, invented in 1959 by Shong Lue Yang, to write two Hmong languages, Hmong Daw (Hmoob Dawb White Miao) and Hmong Njua AKA Hmong Leng (Moob Leeg Green Miao).

Terminology
The term Phaj hauj means "to unite," "to resist division," or "to have peace" in Hmong.

Form
Pahawh is written from left to right. Each syllable is written with two letters, an onset (la, an initial consonant or consonant cluster) and a rime (yu, a vowel, diphthong, or vowel plus final consonant). However, the order of these elements is rime-initial, the opposite of their spoken order. (That is, each syllable would seem to be written right to left if it were transcribed literally into the Roman alphabet.) This is an indication that Shong conceived of the rimes as primary; Pahawh Hmong might therefore be thought of as a vowel-centered abugida. Tones and many onsets are distinguished by diacritics.

The onset k is not written, so that a rime letter (V) written by itself is read as kV. Nor is the rime au (on mid tone) written, so that an onset letter (C) written by itself is read Cau, except following a bare rime, as otherwise these could be read as a single syllable. The absence of an onset, however, is indicated with a null-onset letter. Again, this is similar to an abugida, but with the roles of consonant and vowel reversed.

For an example of the positional variation, consider the phrase (in RPA orthography) kuv rau tshais rau koj noj "I serve you breakfast". Since the first word, kuv, starts with a k, it is written as the bare rime uv in Pahawh. The word rau, with mid-tone au as the rime, is normally written as a bare onset r, and indeed this is the case for the second instance in this sentence. However, since the first rau follows a bare rime, it cannot be written as a bare onset r, or the combination might be read as ruv rather than kuv rau. Therefore, the combination kuv rau is written uv rau rather than uv r, with the rime au made explicit (Smalley et al. 1990:58).

Pahawh has twenty onset letters to transcribe sixty phonemic onsets. This is accomplished with two diacritics, a dot and a tack, written above the onset. However, although there is some scattered similarity between the sounds of the resulting forms, there is no overall pattern to the system. For example, the letter for h with a dot is pronounced th, and with a tack is pronounced pl. The null consonant does not take diacritics in Hmong Daw, but does in Hmong Njua, for two onsets, ndl and ndlh, which only occur in Hmong Njua. (Similarly, Daw d and dh, which do not occur in Njua, are used for Njua dl and dlh, which do not occur in Daw.)

The rimes, in contrast, are over-specified. There are thirteen rime sounds, but twenty-six letters to represent them. One of each pair takes four of the eight tones, while the other takes the other four tones. Diacritics (none, dot, macron, and trema) distinguish the tones that each rime letter may carry. One of the tones, written -d in RPA, is not phonemic but is a prosodic unit-final allophone of the creaky register -m. It may be written in Pahawh by changing the dot diacritic to a short stroke, but it is not used by many people.

Shong used the rimes with the values kiab and kab in Hmong Daw for kab and kaab in Hmong Njua. However, Cwjmem retains the Daw values for Njua and adds a pipe (|) to the left of kab etc. to write kaab etc.

In addition to phonetic elements, Pahawh Hmong has a minor logographic component, with characters for
arithmetical signs
periods of time: year, season, month, day, date
the most common grammatical classifier, lub, which when written out phonetically consists of two very similar letters, and
eighteen clan signs. These were never disseminated, but were intended to clarify personal relationships in Hmong refugee camps, where people regularly met strangers of unknown clan. Strict taboos govern the behavior of Hmong men and women from the same clan.

Punctuation is derived from the Roman alphabet, presumably through French or Lao, except for a sign introduced by one of Shong's disciples that replaced Shong's , but also includes a native sign for reduplication and a native cantillation mark.

Second and third stage tones
There are two orthographic systems in use for Pahawh Hmong, the second reduced stage from 1965 and the third reduced stage from 1970 (see history, below). Some Hmong communities consider the second stage to be more authentic, while others prefer the third stage as being more regular. It would appear that stage two is more widespread.

The differences are primarily in tone assignment. Bare rimes—that is, rime letters without a tone diacritic—have various values in stage two, but are regularly high tone (-b) or rising tone (-v) in stage three. Likewise, although the pedagogic charts are organized so that each column corresponds to a single tone, the tonic diacritics are scattered about the columns in stage two, but correspond to them in stage three. (Stage 4, which today is only used for shorthand, dispenses with the -v rime letters, replacing them with additional diacritics on the -b rime letters, so that each rime and tone has a single dedicated glyph.)

Tone transcription is that of the Romanized Popular Alphabet.

History

Pahawh Hmong was the product of a native messianic movement, based on the idea that, throughout history, God had given the Hmong power through the gift of writing, and revoked it as divine retribution.

In 1959 Shong Lue Yang (RPA: Soob Lwj Yaj;), a Hmong spiritual leader from Laos, created Pahawh. Yang was not previously literate in any language. An illiterate peasant, Shong claimed to be the Son of God, messiah of the Hmong and Khmu people, and that God had revealed Pahawh to him in 1959, in northern Vietnam near the border with Laos, to restore writing to the Hmong and Khmu people. Over the next twelve years he and his disciples taught it as part of a Hmong cultural revival movement, mostly in Laos after Shong had fled Communist Vietnam. The Khmuic version of the script never caught on, and has disappeared. Shong continually modified the Hmong script, producing four increasingly sophisticated versions, until he was assassinated by Laotian soldiers in 1971 to stop his growing influence as part of the opposition resistance. Knowledge of the later stages of Pahawh come to us through his disciple Chia Koua Vang, who corresponded with Shong in prison.

The first stage of Pahawh, Pahawh Pa (Pajhawj Paj), common called the source version, had distinct glyphs for all 60 onsets and 91 rimes of both Hmong Daw and Hmong Njua. Although there were diacritics, there was no relationship between them and the sound values of the letters, and many of the diacritics are unique to a single letter. Among the rimes, there was a strong tendency for letters which differed only in diacritic to share the same vowel and differ in tone. However, this was not absolute. For example, a letter shaped like Ü stood for the rime iaj, while U, differing only in its diacritic, stood for the rime us. Plain U without a diacritic did not occur. Similarly, the letter that, without a diacritic, represents the rime ag, when combined with a diacritic dot represents the onset rh. Thus it can be seen that at this stage the diacritics were integral parts of their letters, with only the beginnings of an independent existence.

Stage 1 was abandoned after Shong revealed the second stage, with only the occasional glyph showing up when people who know it write using other versions. However, it is not considered obsolete, as people remember Shong's instructions to use this source of all later Pahawh as a sacred script

The second stage, Pahawh Njia Dua O (Pajhawj Ntsiab Duas Ob) "second stage reduced version", was the first practical Hmong script. It was taught by Shong in 1965 and is supported today by the Australian Language Institute and Cwjmem (Everson 1999). The consonants are graphically regular, in that each column in the pedagogic charts contains the same diacritic, but are phonetically irregular, in that the diacritics have no consistent meaning. (This situation remained in all later stages.) Tone assignment is irregular, in that the diacritics do not represent specific tones with the rimes any more than they represent specific features with the consonants. For example, the trema sometimes represents the -b tone, sometimes -j, -v, or -g, depending on which rime it is added to. The one exception is the -d "tone", which is actually a prosodic inflection of the -m tone. Shong added a specific diacritic for this when Chia, who was familiar with RPA, asked him how RPA -d should be written, but it was treated as extraneous to the tone system, was not included in the rime charts, and was not always taught to Shong's disciples.
The third stage, Pahawh Njia Dua Pe (Pajhawj Ntsiab Duas Peb) "third stage reduced version", introduced in 1970, regularized tone assignment, which was irregular in the second stage. It restores the null onset, which with the addition of diacritics covers Hmong Njua consonants not found in Hmong Daw, that had been found in stage 1, but does not otherwise change the onsets. Chia believes the lack of this series in stage two was merely an oversight on his part in his prison correspondence with Shong (Smalley et al. 1990:70). It was not distributed as widely in Laos as the second stage, due to fear of admitting knowledge of the script after the Communist takeover. Both second and third stage are currently in use in different Hmong communities; however, because the third stage did not appear widely until after Shong's death, there is a suspicion in many communities that it and the fourth stage were invented by Shong's disciples, and therefore are not authentic Pahawh. In the third stage, there is also presence of different signs for month, tens, and zero.

The final version, Pahawh Tsa (Pajhawj Txha) "core version", published in 1971 just a month before Shong's death, was a radical simplification with one letter per rime and one diacritic per tone. The onsets were not changed. The only graphic addition was that of three new tone marks, for seven total, but half of the rimes were eliminated: The -b, -m, -d, -j tones are written as in stage 3; the -v, -, -s, -g tones now use the same rime letters as the other tones but with different diacritics: circumflex, underlined dot, underlined stroke, and diaeresis. (The diaeresis is retained from stage 3, so only the rime letter changes for this tone.) Stage 4 is not widely known, but is used as a kind of shorthand by some who do know it; indeed, it may be called "Hmong shorthand" in English.

Pahawh is not as widespread as RPA romanization for writing Hmong, partially because of the difficulties in typesetting it, but it is a source of great pride for many Hmong who do not use it, as in Southeast Asia every respectable language has a script of its own, which RPA does not provide. However, for some educated Hmong, Pahawh is considered an embarrassing remnant of a superstitious past (Smalley et al. 1990:165).

Chao Fa (means "Lord of the Sky" in Lao, Hmong: Cob Fab  ), which literally translates to the "Heavenly Lord", a Hmong group whose anti-Laotian government, uses this writing system. Since 1975 until today, the Hmong Chao Fa, isolated from the rest of the world, has been heavily persecuted by the Lao People's Democratic Republic, nonstop and without resolution.

Phonology

Vowels

The vowel systems of Hmong Daw and Mong Njua are as shown in the following charts. Phonemes particular to each dialect are color-coded respectively:

Consonants

Hmong makes a number of phonemic contrasts unfamiliar to English speakers. All non-glottal stops and affricates distinguish aspirated and unaspirated forms, most also prenasalization independently of this. The consonant inventory of Hmong is shown in the chart below. (Consonants particular to Hmong Daw and Mong Njua are color-coded respectively.)

Diacritical marks
The Pahawh Hmong diacritics were devised by Shong Lue Yang in isolation, and have no genetic relation to similar-looking punctuation in the European tradition (DOT ABOVE, DIAERESIS, MACRON). Since it can also typically take shapes that are different from the typical shapes that European punctuation has, it would be inappropriate to attempt to unify Pahawh Hmong diacritics with characters in the General Punctuation mark. Combining diacritics are found at 16B30..16B36 and function in the usual way. Note that 16B34 and 16B35 could be composed (16B32 + 16B30 and 16B32 + 16B31 respectively). Such an encoding is not recommended (because decomposition would break the one-to-four character convention for representing Hmong syllables) and no canonical decomposition is given in the character properties.

Grammar

Pronouns
The Hmong pronominal system distinguishes between three grammatical persons and three numbers – singular, dual, and plural. They are not marked for case, that is, the same word is used to translate both "I" and "me", "she" and "her", and so forth. These are the personal pronouns of Hmong Daw and Mong Njua (in Pahawh Hmong and Hmong RPA):

Logographs

Numeral system
Hmong has a distinctive set of digits:

Counting System

Punctuation marks

Non-script-specific punctuation marks are also used including the question mark (?), left parentheses, right parentheses, period (.), comma, semicolon, colon, less than sign (<), greater than sign (>), and dash (–).

Arithmetic operators

Samples

Origin

Because Shong was illiterate, it is sometimes assumed that he invented Pahawh ex nihilo. However, Shong was acutely aware of writing and of the advantages that it provided; indeed, that was the basis of his messianic movement. It would appear that existing scripts provided his inspiration, even if he did not fully understand them, much as the Roman alphabet inspired the illiterate Sequoyah when he invented the Cherokee script, in a process called trans-cultural diffusion. Not only do the forms of the majority of the letters in the oldest stage of Pahawh closely resemble the letters of the local Lao alphabet and missionary scripts such as Pollard and Fraser, though they are independent in sound value (much like the relationship between Roman and Cherokee), but the appearance of vowel and tone diacritics in those scripts, which would appear nearly random to the illiterate, may explain the idiosyncratic use of diacritics in early Pahawh. Nevertheless, even if the graphic forms of Pahawh letters derive from other scripts, much of the typology of the script, with its primary rimes and secondary onsets, would appear to be Shong's invention.

The later stages of Pahawh became typologically more like Lao and the Roman alphabet, suggesting that perhaps they influenced its evolution. However, even from the start, Pahawh is "fascinatingly similar [...] and fascinatingly different" from the Lao alphabet (Smalley et al. 1990:90). For example, it resembles an abugida such as Lao where the order of writing does not reflect the order of speech, but with the roles of consonant and vowel reversed. There is an inherent vowel, as in Lao, though only on one tone, but also an inherent consonant. In Lao, tone depends on the consonant; it is modified with diacritics, but the patterns of modification are complex. In early Pahawh, tone depends on the rime and is modified with irregular diacritics. Starting with stage 2, there are two tone-classes of rime, just as in Lao there are two tone-classes of consonant.

Nearly all other scripts invented by illiterates are syllabaries like Cherokee. However, to represent Hmong as a syllabary, Pahawh would have needed 60×91 = 5460 letters. By breaking each syllable in two in the fashion of Chinese phonetics, Shong was able to write Hmong, in his original version, with a mere 60+91 = 151 letters.

Unicode 

The Pahawh Hmong alphabet was added to the Unicode Standard in June 2014 with the release of version 7.0.

The Unicode block for Pahawh Hmong is U+16B00–U+16B8F:

Since 2019 until now, Pahawh Hmong has been accepted by Unicode and the UCS for international use. There has been a work of progress for the creation of a Pahawh Hmong Unicode Keyboard.

See also
 Hmong language
 Hmong writing

Fonts
For now, Pahawh Hmong Unicode is only supported by:
 Noto Sans Pahawh Hmong (direct download link), a font made by Google
 Pahawh Unicode (direct download link), Google Drive

References

Ratliff, Martha. 1996. "The Pahawh Hmong Script," in The World's Writing Systems, edited by Peter T. Daniels and Bright, William. University of Oxford Press: New York, NY, pp. 619–624.
Rogers, Henry. 2005. Writing Systems: A Linguistic Approach. Blackwell Publishing. pp. 260–262.
Smalley, William Allen, Chia Koua Vang (Txiaj Kuam Vaj / ), and Gnia Yee Yang (Nyiaj Yig Yaj /). 1990. Mother of Writing: The Origin and Development of a Hmong Messianic Script. University of Chicago Press: Chicago.

External links

Omniglot Pahawh Hmong Alphabet
http://pahawh.org/ The Pahawh Hmong Platform
https://wiki.liamscode.net/unicode/block.php?n=Pahawh%20Hmong Pahawh Hmong Unicode Block
https://unicode-table.com/en/blocks/pahawh-hmong/ Pahawh Hmong
http://pahawh.org/kbm/ Pahawh Hmong Semi-Keyboard
https://drive.google.com/file/d/1rP6wfm7tHsoAkzFPUomTydFr9RXy5uzm/view Pahawh/Romanized PDF

Writing systems
Writing systems introduced in 1959
West Hmongic languages